Räpina is a town in Põlva County, Estonia.  Räpina was administrative centre of Räpina raion from 1950 until 1961, currently it is the administrative centre of Räpina Parish. The oldest commercial enterprise in Räpina is a paper factory that opened in 1734.

Gallery

Notable people
Paul Haavaoks (1924–1983), poet and writer
Aapo Ilves (born 1970), poet, writer, artist and musician
Leonhard Lapin (born 1947), architect, artist, historian, poet and academic
Enno Ootsing (born 1940), artist and academic

References

External links

 
Cities and towns in Estonia
Former municipalities of Estonia
Kreis Werro